The David G. Fales House is a historic house located at 476 High Street in Central Falls, Rhode Island.

Description and history 
The -story, wood-framed house was built in about 1858 and remodeled in a Second Empire style to a design by Clifton A. Hall in 1867. It has a mansard roof with flared eaves studded with brackets, and bracketed bay windows on two sides. The interior was gutted when the house caught fire in the 1960s.

The house was listed on the National Register of Historic Places on April 6, 1979.

See also
National Register of Historic Places listings in Providence County, Rhode Island

References

Houses on the National Register of Historic Places in Rhode Island
Houses in Providence County, Rhode Island
Houses completed in 1858
Second Empire architecture in Rhode Island
Buildings and structures in Central Falls, Rhode Island
National Register of Historic Places in Providence County, Rhode Island